The Type 679 training ship with NATO reporting name Daxin, or 大兴 in Chinese meaning Great Prosper, is a Chinese training ship developed for the People's Liberation Army Navy (PLAN). The ship is more commonly known as Zheng He , after the Ming dynasty admiral of the same name.

Zheng He is the first purpose-built training ship indigenously developed by China. Designed by the 708th Institute of China State Shipbuilding Corporation (CSSC), commonly known as China Shipbuilding and Oceanic Engineering Design Academy (中国船舶及海洋工程设计研究), the ship was built by Qiuxing (求新) Shipyard in Shanghai, a division of Jiangnan Shipyard. 

The ship is designed to be crewed by 170 sailors and 30 instructors assigned to the ship. The ship has a large hospital on board to accommodate cadet classes. She was originally designed to house 108 cadets in addition to the crew and instructors. When the ship first entered service in 1987, she was the first ship in the PLAN to incorporate entertainment rooms (there are two such rooms). The vessel supports training in over forty subjects. 

In April 1989, Zheng He became the first ship in the PLAN to visit the United States when she visited Hawaii. Between April 16 and September 21, 2012, Zheng He conducted her first circumnavigation of the globe, crossing three oceans, visiting 11 countries, and covering more than 30,000 nautical miles over the course of a 159-day voyage.

References

People's Liberation Army Navy
Auxiliary ships of the People's Liberation Army Navy
Training ships of the People's Liberation Army Navy
Auxiliary training ship classes
Ships built in China
1986 ships
Dalian
zh:郑和号训练舰